The 2020 season was the Green Bay Packers' 100th season in the National Football League, their 102nd overall and their second under head coach Matt LaFleur.

They matched their 13–3 record and NFC Championship appearance from the last season, clinching home-field advantage in the NFC playoffs for the first time since 2011. Green Bay's offense scored less than 30 points only 4 times during the regular season.

The Packers clinched both their second consecutive playoff berth and NFC North title following a Week 14 win against the Lions and a Vikings loss to the Buccaneers the same day. With their victory over the Bears in Week 17, they earned home field advantage, a first round bye, and the No. 1 seed in the NFC playoffs. They would defeat the Los Angeles Rams 32–18 in the Divisional round, but their season ended after a 31–26 defeat to the eventual Super Bowl champion Tampa Bay Buccaneers in the NFC Championship Game. Aaron Rodgers won his third NFL MVP at the NFL Honors for his performance in 2020.

Player movements

Free agents

Additions

Subtractions

Draft

Notes

Undrafted free agent additions

Roster cuts
The roster was cut to 53 on September 5, 2020.

Staff

Final roster

Preseason
The Packers' preseason schedule was announced on May 7, but was later cancelled due to the COVID-19 pandemic.

Regular season

Schedule
The Packers' 2020 schedule was announced on May 7.

Note: Intra-division opponents are in bold text.

Game summaries

Week 1: at Minnesota Vikings

Week 2: vs. Detroit Lions

Week 3: at New Orleans Saints

Week 4: vs. Atlanta Falcons

Week 6: at Tampa Bay Buccaneers

Week 7: at Houston Texans

Week 8: vs. Minnesota Vikings

Week 9: at San Francisco 49ers

Week 10: vs. Jacksonville Jaguars

Week 11: at Indianapolis Colts

Week 12: vs. Chicago Bears

The Packers secured their 100th victory against the Bears.

Week 13: vs. Philadelphia Eagles

Week 14: at Detroit Lions

Week 15: vs. Carolina Panthers

Week 16: vs. Tennessee Titans

Week 17: at Chicago Bears

Standings

Division

Conference

Postseason

Schedule

Game summaries

NFC Divisional Playoffs: vs. (6) Los Angeles Rams

NFC Championship: vs. (5) Tampa Bay Buccaneers

Statistics

Starters

Regular season

Offense

Defense

Playoffs

Offense

Defense

Team leaders

League rankings

Awards

References

External links
 

Green Bay
Green Bay Packers seasons
Green Bay Packers
NFC North championship seasons